Sci-Fi-London (stylised as SCI-FI-LONDON), also known as The London International Festival of Science Fiction and Fantastic Film or simply SFL, is an annual United Kingdom-based film festival dedicated to the science fiction and fantasy genres. Originally founded in 2002, it has been held at the Stratford Picturehouse in London since 2008.

The Arthur C. Clarke Award

Sci-Fi-London hosts the awards ceremony for the Arthur C. Clarke Award. It is awarded to the best science fiction novel which received its first British publication during a calendar year, chosen by jury.

References

External links
 SCI-FI-LONDON Homepage
 Arthur C. Clarke Award Homepage

Fantasy and horror film festivals in the United Kingdom
Film festivals in London
Film festivals established in 2002
British science fiction
2002 establishments in the United Kingdom
Science fiction film festivals